Inamorata is a 2004 novel by American novelist and screenwriter Joseph Gangemi. The book was released on January 22, 2004 through Viking Adult and focuses on the investigation of Mina Crandon, a spiritualist from, the 1920s. Film rights for Inamorata were purchased in 2006 by Johnny Depp's film company, Infinitum Nihil.

Synopsis
Inamorata follows Martin Finch, a young college student from Harvard University and member of Scientific American, that is set to investigate Mina Crawley, a socialite and alleged spiritualist. Finch is sure that he will find proof that Crawley is a fraud but instead finds himself smitten with the beautiful young woman.

Reception
Critical reception for the book has been mixed to positive, with a reviewer for The New York Times criticizing the main character of Finch as "an oddly blank protagonist". Inamorata received positive reviews from the St. Petersburg Times and The News Journal, with the reviewer for the St. Petersburg Times calling it a "compelling debut". In contrast, the Journal Sentinel overall panned the novel, stating that it started well but later "unravels". Publishers Weekly gave a mixed review, writing that the book was enjoyable but that plot was "a bit weak" and that references to songs and wisecracks from the era "wear thin".

References

2004 novels
Novels based on actual events
Viking Press books